James, Jim, or Jimmy Green may refer to:

Politics
 James Green (New Zealand politician) (1836–1905), New Zealander who was a Member of Parliament
 James A. Green (politician) (1930–2011), American who was a US Representative for Pennsylvania
 James C. Green (1922–2000), American politician who was lieutenant governor of North Carolina
 James D. Green (1798–1882), American politician who was mayor of Cambridge, Massachusetts
 James S. Green (1817–1870), American U.S. Senator and Representative from Missouri
 Jim Green (councilman) (1943–2012), Canadian politician and university instructor
 Jimmy Green (South African politician), South African trade unionist and politician

Sports
 James Green (basketball) (born 1960), American college coach
 James Green (Canadian football) (born 1983), Canadian former player in the Canadian Football League
 James Green (footballer) (1879–1940), English player for Preston North End F.C.
 James Green (rugby league) (born 1990), English league player with Hull KR and Castleford Tigers
 James Green (wrestler) (born 1992), American former amateur wrestler
 Jamie Green (born 1982), British racing driver
 Jamie Green (footballer) (born 1989), English football player
 Jim Green (baseball) (1854–1912), American professional player in the 19th century
 Jimmy Green (cricketer) (born 1943), English cricketer
 Jimmy Green (golfer) (born 1969), American former professional golfer

Religion
 James Green (bishop) (born 1950), American Roman Catholic archbishop and diplomat
 Jim Green (born 1946), American clergyman, co-founder of the Aggressive Christianity Missionary Training Corps

Other
 James Green (artist) (1771–1834), English portrait-painter
 James Green (author) (born 1944), English author and broadcaster
 James Green (engineer) (1781–1849), British engineer who worked on the Grand Western, Rolle and Chard Canals
 James Green (historian) (1944–2016), American historian and labor activist
 James Green (RFC airman) (1897–1917), British World War I flying ace
 James Alexander Green (1926–2014), British mathematician
 James I. J. Green, British dental technician and ninth President of the Dental Technologists Association
 James L. Green, scientist and administrator at NASA
 James N. Green, professor of modern Latin American history
 James S. Green (attorney) (1792–1862), U.S. Attorney for the District of New Jersey
 Jamison Green (born 1948), American trans man and activist
 Jim Green (activist), Australian anti-nuclear campaigner
 Maurice Green (journalist) (James Maurice Spurgeon Green, 1906–1987), British newspaper editor
 Woody Rock (James Green, born 1976), American singer and musician from Dru Hill

See also
James Greene (disambiguation)
James Green Martin (1819–1878), Confederate soldier